Ilivasi Sevia Tabua Tamanivalu (born 30 September 1964 in Naivicula) is a Fijian former rugby union footballer who played at international level for both Fiji and Australia as a flanker. He was nicknamed The Human Skewer.

He also coached Fiji at the 2007 Rugby World Cup.

Career
Tabua played for Australia sevens team in the 1993 Rugby World Cup Sevens, after which he played for Australia in fifteens in the 1995 Rugby World Cup. He has played 10 tests for Australia. In the 1999 Rugby World Cup he played for
the Fiji team.

Personal life
He was raised in a family of seven siblings five boys and two girls, his son's named Ilivasi Noah Taminivalu. He later left Noah and his mother. He spent the first 12 years of his childhood in the Lau group as his father was a teacher at one of the schools on the chiefly island. Ilivasi started school at Mabula, Cicia in Lau before his family moved to the mainland in the 1970s. His family settled at Naivicula, Tailevu where his father comes from. He attended Marist Brothers High School. In 1980, Ilivasi left to further his studies in Australia.

Coaching career
After retiring from international rugby, he came back to Fiji to help the Fiji team to prepare for the 2007 Rugby World Cup.  He was recently appointed the head coach of Fiji's HPU and helped the former Fiji coach Wayne Pivac with the Fiji team, but when Pivac resigned from Fiji rugby in January 2007, Tabua was picked as the man to replace him and he was chosen as the new coach. He was also the first Fijian to be appointed the national coach to the Rugby World Cup. He comes at the tail end of a succession of expatriates including George Simpkin, Brad Johnstone, Greg Smith, Mac McCallion and Pivac who left in January 2007. On 19 August 2009 Tabua was sacked by the Fiji Rugby Union citing off-field incidents during Fiji's 2009 IRB Pacific Nations Cup campaign.

Notes and references

External links
Bio
HPU
New Coach
Fiji Times interview
Fiji profile

1964 births
Living people
People educated at Marist Brothers High School, Fiji
Fijian rugby union coaches
Fijian rugby union players
Rugby union flankers
Australian rugby union players
Australia international rugby union players
Fiji international rugby union players
Fiji national rugby union team coaches
Fijian emigrants to Australia
People from Nadroga-Navosa Province